Copelatus nakamurai is a species of diving beetle. It is part of the genus Copelatus in the subfamily Copelatinae of the family Dytiscidae. It was described by Guéorguiev in 1970.

References

nakamurai
Beetles described in 1970